The Salado shiner (Notropis saladonis)  is an extinct species of ray-finned fish in the family Cyprinidae.
It was found only in the Rio Salado, a tributary of the Rio Grande in northern Mexico. It was locally known as sardinita de salado.

Sources

 

Salado shiner
Endemic fish of Mexico
Freshwater fish of Mexico
Salado shiner
Salado shiner
Extinct animals of Mexico
Fish described in 1958
Taxa named by Clark Hubbs
Taxonomy articles created by Polbot
Fauna of the Rio Grande valleys